Kazo ior KAZO may refer to:

Places 
 Kazo, Saitama, a city in Japan
 Kazo, Uganda, a town in Uganda
 Kazo District
 Kazo, Hama, a neighbourhood in Hama, Syria
  KAZO, the ICAO code for Kalamazoo/Battle Creek International Airport

Other uses 
 Kazō Kitamori (1916–1998), Japanese theologian
 KAZO-LP, a television station of Nebraska, United States

See also 
 Cazo, a place in Spain
 Kaso (disambiguation)